Karuna Kumar is an Indian film director and screenwriter who works primarily in Telugu cinema. He is best known for directing the 2020 period action thriller film Palasa 1978.

Career 
Karuna Kumar's debut film Palasa 1978 was released in March 2020 opening to positive reviews from the critics. The film revolves around the incidents related to caste discrimination and untouchability. It was featured in year-end best films' charts including Film Companion and The Times of India. His next directorial Metro Kathalu was released on streaming service   Aha. Made as an anthology, The Times of India criticized Kumar's work and felt that the film "doesn’t have a fresh theme". He then directed Sridevi Soda Center featuring Sudheer Babu and Anandhi in lead roles. Writing for The Hindu, Sangeetha Devi Dundoo in her review, wrote that "With Sridevi Soda Center, Karuna Kumar takes a mainstream approach given the presence of actor Sudheer Babu and tries to keep the narrative gritty while discussing issues of honour". Others critics opined that the film could do much better in terms of screenplay.

Before the release of Sridevi Soda Center, in July 2021, The Hans India reported that Kumar has eight upcoming films. In November 2021, he walked out of the Telugu remake of Malayalam film Nayattu, over creative differences.

Filmography

Awards and nominations

References

External links 

 

Living people
Film directors from Andhra Pradesh
21st-century Indian film directors
Telugu film directors
Screenwriters from Andhra Pradesh
Telugu screenwriters
Indian screenwriters
Indian film directors
South Indian International Movie Awards winners
Santosham Film Awards winners
Year of birth missing (living people)